Manuel Farrona-Pulido (born 1 May 1993) is a German professional footballer who plays as a midfielder for VfB Lübeck.

Club career
Farrona-Pulido started playing youth football at Hemdingen-Bilsen before he moved on to Holsatia Elmshorn and eventually the youth department at Hamburger SV in 2006. Although he played for the club's reserve team from 2012, he could not break into the first team and moved to Wacker Nordhausen in 2014 where he scored nine goals in 26 matches before joining newly promoted 1. FC Magdeburg for the new 2015–16 3. Liga season.

International career
Farrona-Pulido was born in Germany and is of Spanish descent. In 2010, Farrona-Pulido played two matches for Germany's Under-18 national team against Ukraine and Turkey.

Career statistics

References

1993 births
Living people
Association football midfielders
German footballers
Germany youth international footballers
German people of Spanish descent
Hamburger SV II players
FSV Wacker 90 Nordhausen players
1. FC Magdeburg players
SC Fortuna Köln players
VfL Osnabrück players
FC Hansa Rostock players
SC Preußen Münster players
VfB Lübeck players
2. Bundesliga players
3. Liga players
Regionalliga players